David "Hap" Wilson is a Canadian naturalist, canoe tripper, author, illustrator and photographer. He has published numerous Canadian canoe-route guides and books about wilderness life.

Works 
 Grey Owl and Me,   with Dundurn Press
 Trails and Tribulations,  with Dundurn Press
 The Cabin,  with Dundurn Press
 Canoeing, Kayaking & Hiking Temagami, 
 Canoeing and Hiking Wild Muskoka, 
 Riviere Dumoine, 
 Rivers of the Upper Ottawa Valley, 
 Missinaibi: Journey to the Northern Sky
 Wilderness Rivers of Manitoba
 Wilderness Manitoba: Land Where the Spirit Lives

References

External links 
 Biographical Summary

Canadian environmentalists
Canadian male canoeists
Canadian naturalists
Living people
Canadian nature writers
Year of birth missing (living people)